Calderwood is a suburb in the City of Shellharbour in New South Wales, Australia, lying to the northwest of Albion Park. It is currently undergoing suburban redevelopment through Lendlease.

Population
 The most common birth location was Australia (73.9%) followed by England (5.7%), Spain (3.4%), Scotland (1.7%), Netherlands (1.7%) and Italy (1.7%).
 87% of people only spoke English at home. 
 The most common responses for religion were Catholic (39.5%), Anglican (31.7%) and No Religion (14.4%).

Education 
There is currently 1 school in Calderwood:
 Calderwood Christian School

Recreation 
The main recreational attraction in Calderwood is the Calderwood Valley Golf Course, which has a total of 18 holes totaling 5091 metres.

Redevelopment 
Calderwood is currently undergoing a suburban redevelopment through Lendlease. 
According to the Calderwood Valley Masterplan, there is:
 A proposed village centre and town centre
 A proposed government primary school and government high school
 A proposed permanent community centre
 A proposed recreation precinct and park.
The development is set to be one of the largest master-planned communities in the Illawarra region, with 609 hectares providing around 4,800 homes for an estimated 12,500 residents.

References

City of Shellharbour
Suburbs of Wollongong